Urmis (also, Urumys) is a village in the Nakhchivan Autonomous Republic of Azerbaijan.

References 

Populated places in Nakhchivan Autonomous Republic